Viktória Gyürkés (born 15 October 1992) is a Hungarian runner specialising in the 3000 metres steeplechase. She represented her country at the 2017 World Championships without reaching the final. In addition, she won the silver medal at the 2017 Summer Universiade.

International competitions

Personal bests

Outdoor
1500 metres – 4:13.52 (Székesfehérvár 2017)
One mile – 4:34.25 (Székesfehérvár 2018)
3000 metres – 9:03.16 (Gothenburg 2018)
5000 metres – 16:04.04 (Budapest 2017)
10,000 metres – 34:55.82 (Budapest 2015)
10 kilometres – 35:02 (Szombathely 2014)
2000 metres steeplechase – 6:15.46 (Győr 2018)
3000 metres steeplechase – 9:35.42 (Berlin 2018)

Indoor
800 metres – 2:07.28 (Budapest 2019)
1500 metres – 4:14.93 (Dortmund 2019)
3000 metres – 9:03.56 (Glasgow 2019)

References

1992 births
Living people
Hungarian female middle-distance runners
Hungarian female steeplechase runners
World Athletics Championships athletes for Hungary
Universiade medalists in athletics (track and field)
Universiade silver medalists for Hungary
Hungarian Athletics Championships winners
Competitors at the 2015 Summer Universiade
Medalists at the 2017 Summer Universiade